Against the Flow , is an Armenian crime drama television series developed by Mher Mkrtchyan. The series premiered on Armenia 1 on September 25, 2017. The series main purpose is to find out who will go against the flow for principles and the common good. The producers of the TV series are Ruben Jaghinyan and Arman Mitoyan.
The series takes place in Yerevan, Armenia.

Cast and characters
 Babken Chobanyan portrays Armen 
 Samvel Topalyan portrays Vova/Max
 Nazeni Hovhannisyan portrays Mary
 Samvel Tadevosyan portrays Tonikyan
 Ani Khachikyan portrays Lilith
 Aram Karakhanyan portrays Samvel Santrosyan
 Milena Avanesyan portrays Andgela
 Georgi Hovakimyan portrays Avet
 Artzrun Chobanyan portrays Karen

References

External links
 
 Against the Flow at the Internet Movie Database

Armenian-language television shows
Armenian drama television series
Public Television Company of Armenia original programming